Oakford Park is a neighborhood within the city limits of Tampa, Florida. As of the 2010 census the neighborhood had a population of 1,473. The ZIP Codes serving the neighborhood are 33607 and 33609. The neighborhood is home to the WTVT-Channel 13 studios.

Geography
Oakford Park boundaries are Kennedy Boulevard to the south, the MacDill Avenue to the east, Dale Mabry Highway to the west, and Cypress Street to the north.

Demographics
Source: Hillsborough County Atlas

At the 2010 census there were 1,473 people and 610 households residing in the neighborhood. The population density was 4,090/mi2. The racial makeup of the neighborhood was 78% White, 10% African American, 0% Native American, 0% Asian, 6% from other races, and 3% from two or more races. Hispanic or Latino of any race were 48%.

Of the 610 households 21% had children under the age of 18 living with them, 37% were married couples living together, 15% had a female householder with no husband present, and 10% were non-families. 30% of households were made up of individuals.

The age distribution was 17% under the age of 18, 19% from 18 to 34, 23% from 35 to 49, 20% from 50 to 64, and 22% 65 or older. For every 100 females, there were 92.5 males.

The per capita income for the neighborhood was $20,430. About 17% of the population were below the poverty line, 22% of those are under the age of 18.

See also
Neighborhoods in Tampa, Florida

References

External links
Oakford Park Neighborhood Association

Neighborhoods in Tampa, Florida